Shalu District (lit: Sand Deer) is a suburban district in central Taichung City, Taiwan.

History 
Originally a settlement of the Papora people, this region was named . During the Kingdom of Tungning (1662－1683), the Taiwanese Plains Aborigines were driven away or sinicized, and the area became a Han settlement. In 1731 during Qing rule, Tamsui Subprefecture extended from the Tai-kah River northward up to Kelang (Keelung).

In 1920, during Japanese rule, the written name was changed to Sharoku. Administratively, Sharoku was under , Taichū Prefecture. In Taiwanese Hokkien, the old name is still used.

In 1945 the village was changed to a township, and was upgraded to a district in 2010.

Administrative divisions 

Juren, Luoquan, Shalu, Meiren, Xingren, Xingan, Doudi, Lufeng, Luliao, Zhulin, Lifen, Fuxing, Beishi, Jinjiang, Liulu, Nanshi, Puzi, Sanlu, Gongming, Qingquan and Xishi Village.

Native products 
 Pork and products
 Peanuts

Education 
 Hungkuang University
 Providence University

Tourist attractions 
 Kang Chu Sports Park
 Lufeng Night Market
 Jingyi Night Market
 Gongming Night Market

Transportation

Airport 
 Taichung International Airport

Railway stations 
 Shalu Station

Roads 

 Freeway 3
 Provincial Highway 10
 Provincial Highway 10B
 Provincial Highway 12

Notable natives 
 Hung Tzu-yung, member of Legislative Yuan (2016–2020)
 Yen Ching-piao, member of Legislative Yuan (2002–2012)
 Yen Kuan-heng, member of Legislative Yuan (2013–2020)

See also 
 Taichung

References

External links 

  

Districts of Taichung
Taiwan placenames originating from Formosan languages